Chapiquiña is a village in the Arica and Parinacota Region, Chile.

See also 

 Chapiquiña power plant

References

Populated places in Parinacota Province